"Venom" is a song and an EP by The Shermans, released as their second single on April 13, 2009.

Track listing

Charts

References

2009 singles
2009 songs